The Indian Journal of Radiology and Imaging is a peer-reviewed open access medical journal published Medknow Publications on behalf of the Indian Radiology and Imaging Association. It covers all aspects of radiology and medical imaging.

Abstracting and indexing 
The journal is abstracted and indexed in Abstracts on Hygiene and Communicable Diseases, CAB Abstracts, CINAHL, EBSCO databases, EmCare, Excerpta Medica/Embase, Expanded Academic ASAP, and Scopus.

External links 
 

Open access journals
Quarterly journals
English-language journals
Radiology and medical imaging journals
Publications established in 1991
Medknow Publications academic journals
Academic journals associated with learned and professional societies of India
1991 establishments in India